The 1968 LPGA Championship was the fourteenth LPGA Championship, held June 20–24 at Pleasant Valley Country Club in Sutton, Massachusetts, southeast of Worcester.

In an 18-hole Monday playoff, Sandra Post won her only major title, defeating defending champion and LPGA president Kathy Whitworth by seven strokes. Post turned 20 earlier in the month and this was the first of her eight victories on the LPGA Tour. It was the only women's major won by a Canadian for 48 years, until 18-year-old Brooke Henderson won this event in 2016.

This was the second consecutive LPGA Championship held at Pleasant Valley, and the second of seven in an eight-year stretch.
The PGA Tour also played at the course this year; the inaugural Kemper Open was held in mid-September, won by

Past champions in the field

Source:

Final leaderboard
Sunday, June 23, 1968

Defending champion Kathy Whitworth sank a three-foot (0.9 m) putt on the final hole to tie Sandra Post and force a Monday playoff. Both shot even-par 73 on Sunday to finish at 294 (+2).

Source:

Playoff
Monday, June 24, 1968

Source:

Scorecard

{|class="wikitable" span = 50 style="font-size:85%;
|-
|style="background: Red;" width=10|
|Eagle
|style="background: Pink;" width=10|
|Birdie
|style="background: PaleGreen;" width=10|
|Bogey
|style="background: Green;" width=10|
|Double bogey
|style="background: Olive;" width=10|
|Triple bogey+
|}
Source:

References

External links
Golf Stats leaderboard
Pleasant Valley Country Club

LPGA Championship
LPGA Championship
LPGA Championship
Golf in Massachusetts
History of Worcester County, Massachusetts
LPGA Championship
Sports competitions in Massachusetts
Sports in Worcester County, Massachusetts
Sutton, Massachusetts
Tourist attractions in Worcester County, Massachusetts
Women's PGA Championship
Women's sports in Massachusetts